Gradašnica may refer to:

 Gradašnica (Leskovac), a village in Serbia
 Gradašnica (Pirot), a village in Serbia